Eileen Colgan Simpson (2 January 1934 – 10 March 2014) was an Irish theatre, television and film actress. She was best known for her recurring role as Esther Roche on the RTÉ One soap opera, Fair City. She also appeared in the RTÉ television drama, Glenroe, as Mynah, the housekeeper of the priest. Her other television credits included Ballykissangel, The Hanging Gale and Strumpet City.

She began her acting career in Irish theatre in Dublin. Colgan then moved to London, where she appeared in television and radio roles. She also appeared on stage in Tokyo.

Colgan was a longtime member of the Abbey Theatre Players in Dublin from 1971 until 1988. In 1973, she won a Jacob's Award for Best Television Performance by an Actress for her role in Hatchet.

Her filmography included roles in Quackser Fortune Has a Cousin in the Bronx in 1970, My Left Foot in 1989, Far and Away in 1992, The Secret of Roan Inish in 1994, Angela's Ashes in 1999, and Tara Road in 2005.

Eileen Colgan died on 10 March 2014, at the age of 80. She was survived by four children and eight grandchildren. Colgan was the widow of theatre director Alan Simpson, whom she had married after his divorce from Carolyn Swift. Simpson died in 1980.

Filmography

References

External links

1930s births
2014 deaths
Irish film actresses
Irish television actresses
Irish stage actresses
Jacob's Award winners
Abbey Theatre